William Peter Adams,  (17 April 1936 – 28 September 2018), commonly known as Peter Adams, was a Canadian politician from Ontario. He was a Liberal member of Canada's House of Commons from 1993 to 2006 representing the riding of Peterborough. Previously, Adams represented the provincial riding of Peterborough in the Legislative Assembly of Ontario from 1987 to 1990, sitting as a member of the Ontario Liberal Party.

Background
Adams was born in Ellesmere Port, United Kingdom and educated at the University of Sheffield and McGill University. He served as director of the subarctic research laboratory in Schefferville, Quebec, and was a member of the Geography department and coordinator of Northern Studies at Trent University in Peterborough, where he was later Emeritus Professor. Adams also served as Vice President – Academic while at Trent. Adams has authored many books and articles, and co-edited the regional history Peterborough and the Kawarthas. In 1981, he was named as Peterborough's Citizen of the Year.

Provincial politics
In 1977, Adams ran as the Liberal candidate in the 1977 provincial election, but finished third against Progressive Conservative John Turner and incumbent New Democrat Gill Sandeman. He ran again in the 1981 provincial election, and finished second against Turner.

Adams ran for the seat again in the 1987 provincial election, and won by a comfortable majority amid a landslide provincial victory for the Liberal Party. He served as a backbench supporter of David Peterson and was appointed as parliamentary assistant to Minister of the Environment Jim Bradley from 1989 to 1990.

The Liberals were defeated by the New Democratic Party in the 1990 provincial election, and Adams lost his seat to NDP candidate Jenny Carter by 185 votes.

Federal politics
Adams was elected to the Canadian House of Commons in the federal election of 1993, defeating Progressive Conservative incumbent Bill Domm by almost 16,000 votes. He was re-elected in the elections of 1997, 2000, and 2004, each time by a comfortable margin.

He was for many years a prominent supporter of Jean Chrétien, opposing Paul Martin's bid to succeed Chrétien as party leader. Adams was appointed by Martin as Parliamentary Secretary to the Minister of Human Resources and Skills Development and Minister responsible for Democratic Renewal on 20 July 2004. He did not stand for re-election in the 2006 federal election.

In 2012 he was made a member of the Order of Ontario.

Electoral record (partial)

References

External links 
 How'd They Vote?: Peter Adams' voting history and quotes
 
 

1936 births
2018 deaths
Alumni of the University of Sheffield
British emigrants to Canada
Canadian geographers
Liberal Party of Canada MPs
McGill University alumni
Members of the House of Commons of Canada from Ontario
Members of the Order of Ontario
Members of the King's Privy Council for Canada
Ontario Liberal Party MPPs
People from Ellesmere Port
People from Peterborough, Ontario
21st-century Canadian politicians